Senator Schrock may refer to:

Ed Schrock (Nebraska politician) (born 1943), Nebraska State Senate
Ed Schrock (born 1941), Virginia State Senate